Samuel Lee may refer to:
 Samuel Lee (minister) (1625–1691), English Puritan
 Samuel Lee (linguist) (1783–1852), English Orientalist  and linguist
 Samuel Lee (judge) (1756–1805), businessman, judge and politician in New Brunswick
 Samuel Lee (American minister) (1803–1881), American minister, author, and legislator
 Samuel Phillips Lee (1812–1897), Civil War rear admiral
 Samuel Lee (1920–2016), also Sammy Lee (diver), American diver and physician

See also
Sam Lee (disambiguation)
Sammy Lee (disambiguation)
Samuel Leigh (disambiguation)